Douglas Rye is an American voice actor who has done Narration for such notable companies as Bank of America, The Discovery Channel, The Learning Channel, NBC, The Playboy Channel, Qwest, Carl's Jr. and DaimlerChrysler. Rye has been acting since he was a child, he beat out Christopher Reeve for a role in a summer production at The Lawrenceville School, during his four years there. He studied at New York University with the likes of Olympia Dukakis and Lloyd Richards, and during his time there worked alongside Jason Robards III, Melissa Manchester, Michael McKean and Christopher Guest.

He also worked behind the scenes for many great and classic musical acts. He toured with the Grateful Dead as part of the behind the scenes crew for nine years. He also was a stage hand at the historic Woodstock Festival in 1969. He has even performed as an opening act for Carlos Santana.

Douglas has also been a crew member for such famous musical acts as The Rolling Stones, Pink Floyd, The Commodores, The Eagles, The Oak Ridge Boys and Mel Tormé.

Douglas is currently known to many people as an American voice actor. His most iconic role would be Mr. Gentleman on Read or Die.

Credits
.hack franchise as Silver Knight
Burn-Up Excess as Additional Voices
Code Geass R2 as Black King (Ep.1)
Dead Leaves as Bobafett Guy; Caterpillar; Dr. Yabu; Easter Island Guy; White Haired Guy
Ghost in the Shell: Stand Alone Complex as Litton (Ep. 2); President of Meditech (Ep. 8); Secretary (Ep. 8)
Ghost in the Shell: S.A.C. 2nd GIG as Analyst (Ep. 41); Minister of Defence (Eps. 42, 49, 50)
MÄR as Gaira; Garon 
Naruto the Movie: Legend of the Stone of Gelel as Haido
Rainbow Six as John Clark
Red Alert 2/Yuri's Revenge as Flak Trooper
Read or Die as Mr. Gentleman; Jean-Henri Fabre
Resident Evil 5 as Dan DeChant
Star Wars: Galactic Battlegrounds as the Attack Tank and X-wing pilots

References

External links

Living people
American male film actors
American male television actors
American male video game actors
American male voice actors
New York University alumni
University of Vermont alumni
American male guitarists
20th-century American guitarists
20th-century American male actors
20th-century American singers
21st-century American guitarists
21st-century American male actors
21st-century American singers
20th-century American male singers
21st-century American male singers
Year of birth missing (living people)